George William Smith (June 13, 1914 – March 5, 1986) was an American football center in the National Football League for the Washington Redskins, the Brooklyn Tigers, and the Boston Yanks.  Smith also played in the All-America Football Conference for the San Francisco 49ers.  He played college football at the University of California.

References

1914 births
1986 deaths
American football centers
California Golden Bears football players
Washington Redskins players
Brooklyn Tigers players
Boston Yanks players
San Francisco 49ers (AAFC) players
Players of American football from Los Angeles
San Francisco 49ers players